That's Nat is an album by jazz cornetist Nat Adderley first released on the Savoy label featuring performances by Adderley with Jerome Richardson, Hank Jones, Wendell Marshall, and Kenny Clarke.

Reception

The Penguin Guide to Jazz states "Jones comping is inch-perfect throughout and Clarke is right on the case, often following Adderley outside the basic count for a phrase or two". The Allmusic review stated "His pithy, pungent trumpet and cornet work is effective in a hard bop context, although his own work outside his brother's group has never seemed quite as effective".

Track listing
All compositions by Nat Adderley & Julian "Cannonball" Adderley except where noted
 "Porky" - 5:15  
 "I Married an Angel" (Lorenz Hart, Richard Rodgers) - 4:32  
 "Big "E"" - 10:40  
 "Kuzzin's Buzzin'" - 5:10  
 "Ann Springs" (Mal Waldron) - 6:17  
 "You Better Go Now" (Robert Graham, Bickley S. Reichmer) - 5:58

Personnel
Nat Adderley – cornet
Jerome Richardson - tenor saxophone, flute
Hank Jones - piano
Wendell Marshall - bass
Kenny Clarke - drums

References

1955 albums
Savoy Records albums
Nat Adderley albums
Albums produced by Bob Shad
Albums recorded at Van Gelder Studio